Exbury Gardens is a  informal woodland garden in Hampshire, England with large collections of rhododendrons, azaleas and camellias, and is often considered the finest garden of its type in the United Kingdom.  Exbury holds the national collection of Nyssa (Tupelo) and Oxydendrum under the National Plant Collection scheme run by the Plant Heritage charity.  The gardens are rated Grade II* on the National Register of Historic Parks and Gardens.

Lionel Nathan de Rothschild purchased the Exbury estate in 1919 and soon began creating a garden on an ambitious scale, emulating his father's at Gunnersbury Park in London.  Exbury House itself is a neoclassical mansion which was built around an earlier structure in the 1920s. The gardens are open to the public, but the house is not.

Location
Exbury Gardens is situated in the village of Exbury, just to the east of Beaulieu, across the river from Buckler's Hard. It is signposted from Beaulieu and from the A326 Southampton to Fawley road in the New Forest.  In the summer, the gardens are served by the New Forest Tour open-top bus service.

The gardens
Exbury Gardens is now open to the public for most of the year, with high seasons in the spring for the flowering shrubs and the autumn for the autumn colour.

The Cinema Museum holds film of the gardens in 1967. HMO363

Administration
The gardens are run by a registered charity, Exbury Gardens Limited, whose objects are "to maintain, improve, develop and preserve Exbury Gardens in Hampshire, including opening them to the public, and to advance horticultural science, knowledge and learning for the public's benefit."

Steam railway 

In the north east corner of the gardens there is also the  gauge Exbury Steam Railway that goes on a journey through a tunnel, around Dragonfly Pond, through the Summer Lane Garden, along the top of the rock gardens and into the American Garden.  The railway was built in 2000–2001 as an additional attraction in the gardens.  Two narrow gauge style 0-6-2 tender tank locos were built specially for the line by the Exmoor Steam Railway. The railway is a member of Britain's Great Little Railways.

The railway however has proved to be more popular than anyone had anticipated, with trains often needing to be double headed.  To solve this problem, a much larger 2-6-2 tender loco, called Marriloo, was built at Exmoor, and entered service on the line in 2008. It is notable for having carried the Queen on a footplate trip round the railway. The railway stages popular Ghost Trains during the October half-term and Santa Steam Specials in the run-up to Christmas.

There’s also a diesel locomotive  called Eddy that is used for shunting operations.

References

External links 

12¼ in gauge railways in England
Botanical gardens in England
Charities based in Hampshire
Country houses in Hampshire
Gardens in Hampshire
Grade II* listed buildings in Hampshire
Grade II* listed houses
Grade II* listed parks and gardens in Hampshire
NCCPG collections in England
New Forest District
Rothschild family residences
Tourist attractions in Hampshire
Woodland gardens